In mathematics, a bivariant theory was introduced by Fulton and MacPherson , in order to put a ring structure on the Chow group of a singular variety, the resulting ring called an operational Chow ring.

On technical levels, a bivariant theory is a mix of a homology theory and a cohomology theory. In general, a homology theory is a covariant  functor from the category of spaces to the category of abelian groups, while a cohomology theory is a contravariant functor from the category of (nice) spaces to the category of rings. A bivariant theory is a functor both covariant and contravariant; hence, the name “bivariant”.

Definition 
Unlike a homology theory or a cohomology theory, a bivariant class is defined for a map not a space.

Let  be a map. For such a map, we can consider the fiber square

(for example, a blow-up.) Intuitively, the consideration of all the fiber squares like the above can be thought of as an approximation of the map .

satisfying the certain compatibility conditions.

Operational Chow ring 

The basic question was whether there is a cycle map:

If X is smooth, such a map exists since  is the usual Chow ring of X.  has shown that rationally there is no such a map with good properties even if X is a linear variety, roughly a variety admitting a cell decomposition. He also notes that Voevodsky's motivic cohomology ring is "probably more useful " than the operational Chow ring for a singular scheme (§ 8 of loc. cit.)

References 

 
 Dan Edidin and Matthew Satriano, Towards an intersection Chow cohomology for GIT quotients
 
 
 The last two lectures of Vakil, Math 245A Topics in algebraic geometry: Introduction to intersection theory in algebraic geometry

External links 
 nLab- bivariant cohomology theory

Algebraic geometry

Homology theory
Cohomology theories
Functors
Abelian group theory